The Glasgow Merchants' Charity Cup was a knockout football tournament open to teams from in and around Glasgow and later on in the tournament's history, teams from outwith Glasgow. Invitations were made and sent out by the Glasgow Charity Cup Committee (GCCC) at their discretion, but no criteria were ever published.

Like many domestic competitions in Scottish football, it was dominated by the Old Firm of Rangers and Celtic, with 31 and 28 victories each respectively. In the latter years of the tournament, it ceased being a knockout tournament and became a one-off contest between a Glasgow Select and a team invited from the English League.

Clubs 

The early years of the tournament featured teams from outside Glasgow. The committee often invited teams based on name and popularity.

Half of the eight-team draw for the 1887–88 tournament included Hibernian, Dumbarton, Renton, and Vale of Leven. All four clubs were former Scottish Cup winners from outside the city.

Charity 
After Renton were presented with the trophy by the Lord Provost of Glasgow in 1886, it was revealed a total of £5620 had been raised for local charities since the tournament had been instituted (equivalent to almost £750,000 in 2021 rates). An academic study in 2008 calculated that during its 90-year existence the competition raised funds to the value of £11 million.

A portion of the proceeds from 1887–88 went Edinburgh and Dumbartonshire charities, as teams from these areas competed for the cup too.

Finals

Performance by club

Notes

See also
Rosebery Charity Cup

References

External links 
 Full results at Scottish Football Historical Archive
 Celtic Glasgow Merchants Charity Cup results (til 1917), FitbaStats
 Clyde Glasgow Merchants Charity Cup results (til 1918), FitbaStats
 Dumbarton Glasgow Merchants Charity Cup results (til 1885), FitbaStats
 Partick Thistle Glasgow Merchants Charity Cup results (til 1917), FitbaStats
 Queen's Park Glasgow Merchants Charity Cup results (til 1961), QPFC.com
 Rangers Glasgow Merchants Charity Cup results (til 1918), FitbaStats
 Third Lanark Glasgow Merchants Charity Cup results (til 1917), FitbaStats
 Vale of Leven Glasgow Merchants Charity Cup results (til 1888), FitbaStats

Defunct football cup competitions in Scotland
Football in Glasgow
Recurring sporting events established in 1877
Recurring sporting events disestablished in 1966
1877 establishments in Scotland
1966 disestablishments in Scotland
Annual sporting events in the United Kingdom
Charity events in the United Kingdom
Charity football matches